A Taste of Yesterday's Wine is a studio album by the American country music artists George Jones and Merle Haggard, released in 1982. They are backed by Don Markham and Jimmy Belken of The Strangers. The album includes the song "Silver Eagle", written by Gary Church, also of The Strangers. This was their first album together; their next album together, Kickin' Out the Footlights...Again, did not come until 24 years later in 2006.

Background
Jones and Haggard were largely influenced by the Hank Williams and Lefty Frizzell tradition. They had also made no secret of how much they admired each other's work. In a Rolling Stone tribute to Jones after his death in 2013, Haggard recalled their first meeting:  "I met him at the Blackboard Café in Bakersfield, California, which was the place to go in '61. He was already famous for not showing up or showing up drunk, and he showed up drunk. I was onstage—I think I was singing Marty Robbins' 'Devil Woman'—and he kicked the doors of the office open and said 'Who the fuck is that?'" Haggard added that Jones's voice was "like a Stradivarius violin: one of the greatest instruments ever made". Jones had said repeatedly over the years that, next to Hank Williams, Haggard was his favorite singer. A Taste of Yesterday's Wine includes tributes to both of them: "Silver Eagle", written by Freddy Powers and Gary Church about Haggard, and "No Show Jones", written by Jones and Glenn Martin about the wayward singer's notorious inability to arrive at concert dates. The album's first single was the Willie Nelson-penned title track, which became a number one hit. A second single, "C.C. Waterback", reached number 10. The LP was produced by Billy Sherrill and has backing vocals by Haggard's wife Leona Williams.

In the UK, Hallmark Records issued an LP with the same title, artwork and tracks, but with a different track order.

Critical reception

Thom Jurek of AllMusic praises the album, marveling that the pair's voices "blend seamlessly and  each other in almost symbiotic fashion... Billy Sherrill in the producer's chair was swinging for the radio fences, and he got close, but even he stayed the hell out of the way most of the time here and let the music take its course, and this pair just treated each other deferentially."

Track listing (Epic)

Track listing (Hallmark)

Personnel
Merle Haggard – vocals
George Jones – vocals
Don Markham – trombone, trumpet
Jimmy Belkin – fiddle
Dave Kirby – guitar
Freddy Powers – guitar
Leona Williams – backing vocals
Billy Sanford – guitar
Pete Bordonali – guitar
Bobby Thompson – guitar
Weldon Myrick – steel guitar
Hargus "Pig" Robbins – keyboards
Bobby Wood – keyboards
Bobby Emmons – keyboards
Terry McMillan – harmonica
Karen Taylor – backing vocals
Lea Jane Berinati – backing vocals
Hershel Wilginton – backing vocals
Dennis Wilson – backing vocals

References

External links
George Jones' official website
Merle Haggard's official website
Record label

1982 albums
George Jones albums
Merle Haggard albums
Epic Records albums
Hallmark Records albums
Vocal duet albums
Albums produced by Billy Sherrill